The Tomb of Two Brothers is an ancient sepulchre in Deir Rifeh, Egypt. It contains the chamber tomb of the ancient Egyptian high status priests Nakht-Ankh and Khnum-Nakht, which dates from the 12th Dynasty.

Tomb

The brothers' tomb was found untouched in 1907 by Flinders Petrie at the Deir Rifeh cemetery. Petrie first described the burial in his excavation report of Rifeh. After the finds went to the Manchester Museum, Margaret Murray published a monograph on this tomb group.

The burial chamber of the two individuals was found in a small chamber placed within the courtyard of a bigger tomb, perhaps once belonging to a governor buried at Deir Rifeh. The chamber tomb contained a set of two coffins, one outer wooden box coffin and one inner anthropoid coffin for each of the tomb owners. The coffins are decorated on the outside with a palace facade motif and several text lines. The coffins and the texts are very close to coffins found at Asyut and it seems possible that they were produced there.

Coffins of Nakht-Ankh 

The rectangular outer coffin bears on the lid three text columns. On the long sides there are four double columns on each side. At the top of the long sides there are two horizontal text lines. The short ends have two columns and again two horizontal text lines. On the lid Nakht-Ankh bears the title son of a governor and is called begotten of Khnumaa. The middle text column is an offering formula addressing Anubis with the wish that the deceased may cross with a ferry, that he might be buried and that he might ascend to the great god. The other spell expressed the wish that Nakht-Ankh might sit in the boat of the sun god, that will cross the heaven. Evidently the spell made sure that Nakht-Ankh will be in the circle of deities after death. The third spell on the lid finally expresses the wish that the deceased becomes the son of the sky goddess Nut to be under her protection. The texts on the coffin box have different functions. Some of the spells are part of the modern corpus of Coffin Texts (on the coffin there are the coffin text spells 30, 31, 32, 609 and 345). Interestingly, the coffin is almost identical to the coffin of a certain Djefahapy that was found at Asyut.

Further objects in the burial 
Next to the coffins was found a canopic box with four canopic vessels. There were three statuettes of the tomb owners. Also, some wooden models of servants, models of boats and some pottery vessels. The whole tomb group is now in the Manchester Museum. The tomb group is one of the best preserved and best known burials of the Egyptian Middle Kingdom.

The tomb owners  
Nakht-ankh and Khnum-nakht are only known from this burial. They are not attested for sure from other sources. Nakht-Ankh bears as only title the designation son of a governor. He is also called  begotten of Khnumaa. Khnum-Nakht bears the titles son of governor, son of the son of a governor and wab-priest of Khnum, lord of Shashotep. He is also called begotten of Khnumaa. Their mummies were found heavily decayed.

Ancient DNA
Ancient DNA analysis of the mummies of Nakht-Ankh and Khnum-Nakht, which were entombed at the Deir Rifeh cemetery, found that the brothers belonged to the M1a1 mtDNA haplogroup with 88.05–91.27% degree of confidence, thus confirming the African origins of the two individuals. The analysis of mitochondrial DNA and the Y chromosomes made it possible to establish that the two titular brothers were actually half brothers, having the same mother but different fathers.

References

Literature 
Rosalie David: The Two Brothers, Death and Afterlife in Middle Kingdom Egypt, Rutherford Press, Bolton 2007 

Tombs of ancient Egypt
Buildings and structures of the Twelfth Dynasty of Egypt